Jamesville Primitive Baptist Church and Cemetery, also known as Jamesville Women's Club, is a historic Primitive Baptist church and cemetery located on the east side of NC 171 in Jamesville, Martin County, North Carolina. It was built between 1865 and 1870, and is a rectangular one-story frame building with gable-front roof.  It is two-bays wide and three bays deep and is sheathed with plain weatherboards. The Jamesville Women's Club acquired the building and its lot in 1953.

It was added to the National Register of Historic Places in 1984.

References

Baptist churches in North Carolina
Cemeteries in North Carolina
Women's clubs in the United States
Churches on the National Register of Historic Places in North Carolina
Churches completed in 1870
Churches in Martin County, North Carolina
Baptist cemeteries in the United States
National Register of Historic Places in Martin County, North Carolina
Primitive Baptists